Angalakuduru railway station (station code:AKU) is an Indian Railway station, located in Tenali of Guntur district in Andhra Pradesh. It is situated on Guntur–Tenali section and is administered by Guntur railway division of South Central Railway zone. It is classified as an F-category station in the division. The station was electrified and a second track was laid, as a part of doubling and electrification works on the Tenali–Guntur section, which was commissioned on 26 April 2019.

References 

Railway stations in Guntur district
Railway stations in Guntur railway division